Paolienlal Haokip is an Indian politician and member of the Bharatiya Janata Party. Haokip was first elected as a member of the Manipur Legislative Assembly from Saikot constituency in Churachandpur District from the Bharatiya Janata Party in 2022.

History
 Elected MLA from 59 Saikot(ST) A/C, 12th Manipur Legislative Assembly 2022.

References

Living people
Manipur MLAs 2022–2027
Manipur politicians
Bharatiya Janata Party politicians from Manipur
Year of birth missing (living people)
People from Churachandpur district